Chrysocraspeda neurina is a species of moth of the  family Geometridae. It is found in Madagascar.

This species has a wingspan of 27 mm. Face and palpus are reddish: Wings, vertex, thorax and abdomen are purplish-grey. There are 2 transversal yellow lines on the fore- and hindwings.

References

External links
 Pictures at Boldsystem.org

Sterrhinae
Moths described in 1934
Lepidoptera of Madagascar
Moths of Madagascar
Moths of Africa